Highway 359 (AR 359, Ark. 359, and Hwy. 359) is a north–south state highway in Johnson County, United States. The route of  runs north from U.S. Route 64 (US 64) near Piney to US 64 in Lamar.

Route description
Highway 359 begins at US 64 near Piney in the southeastern corner of the county near the Arkansas River. The route runs underneath Interstate 40 (I-40) but does not have access to the freeway. Continuing north, Highway 359 passes Piney Bay and Hickeytown before curving west and serving as the southern terminus of Highway 315. The route continues west, entering Lamar and terminating at US 64.

Major intersections

See also

References

External links

Transportation in Johnson County, Arkansas
359